Hanna Maria Yttereng (born 20 February 1991) is a former Norwegian handball player who last played for Vipers Kristiansand.

Achievements 
Junior World Championship:
Gold Medalist: 2010
Junior European Championship:
Gold Medalist: 2009
EHF Champions League:
Winner: 2020/2021, 2021/2022
Bronze Medalist: 2018/2019
EHF Cup: 
Finalist: 2017
Norwegian League:
Winner: 2018/2019, 2019/2020, 2020/2021, 2021/2022
Norwegian Cup:
Winner: 2007, 2018, 2019, 2020, 2021
Finalist: 2006, 2008

References

1991 births
Living people
Sportspeople from Trondheim
Norwegian female handball players 
Expatriate handball players
Norwegian expatriates in Germany
Norwegian expatriates in Hungary